Annette Wieviorka (born on January 10, 1948) is a French historian. She is a specialist in the Holocaust and the history of the Jewish people in the 20th century since the 1992 publication of her thesis, Deportation and genocide between memory and forgetting, defended in 1991 at the Paris Nanterre University.

Biography

Family
Annette Wieviorka's paternal grandparents, Polish Jews, were arrested in Nice during the war and murdered in Auschwitz. The grandfather, Wolf Wiewiorka, was born on March 10, 1896, in Minsk. The grandmother, Rosa Wiewiorka, née Feldman, was born on August 10, 1897 in Siedlce. Their last address in Nice is at 16 rue Reine Jeanne. They were deported by convoy No. 61, dated October 28, 1943, from Drancy internment camp to Auschwitz. They were detained before at Beaune-la-Rolande internment camp. Her father, a refugee in Switzerland, and her mother, daughter of a Parisian tailor, refugee in Grenoble, survived the war. She is the sister of Michel Wieviorka, Sylvie Wieviorka, and Olivier Wieviorka.

Training
Annette Wieviorka has a history (1989) and a doctorate in history (1991). Her thesis, supervised by Annie Kriegel, is entitled Deportation and genocide: oblivion and memory 1943-1948: the case of the Jews in France. This thesis gave rise to a publication in 1992 by Plon. It was reissued in 2003 by Hachette editions.

A committed historian
During the 1970s, she was politically involved in the Maoist movement. From 1974 to 1976, she was a professor of French language and civilization in Canton.

She is involved with the Primo Levi Center (care and support for victims of torture and political violence) as a member of its support committee.

Academic career
Research director at the CNRS, she was a member of the Study Mission on the Spoliation of Jews in France, known as the Mattéoli Mission.

Accolades
Wieviorka was awarded the 2022 Prix Femina essai for Tombeaux : autobiographie de ma famille.

Publications
 L'Écureuil de Chine, Paris, Les presses d'aujourd'hui, 1979 (livre de souvenirs autobiographiques sur son séjour en Chine de 1974 à 1976 - wiewiórka means "squirrel" in Polish) 
 Ils étaient juifs, résistants, communistes, Denoël, 1986
 Le procès de Nuremberg, Ouest-France/Mémorial de Caen, Rennes, Paris, 1995 
 avec Jean-Jacques Becker (dir.), Les Juifs de France, Éditions Liana Levi, « Histoire », 1998 
 Auschwitz expliqué à ma fille, Éditions du Seuil, Paris, 1999 
 L'Ère du témoin, Hachette, « Pluriel », Paris, 2002. 
 Déportation et génocide. Entre la mémoire et l'oubli, Hachette, « Pluriel », Paris, 2003.
 Auschwitz, 60 ans après, Robert Laffont, Paris, 2005 Également publié sous le titre Auschwitz, la mémoire d'un lieu, Hachette, « Pluriel », Paris, 2006 
 Juifs et Polonais : 1939 à nos jours, Albin Michel, coll. « Bibliothèque histoire », Paris, 2009 
 Maurice et Jeannette. Biographie du couple Thorez, Fayard, Paris, 2010  compte rendu de l'ouvrage
 Eichmann de la Traque au Procès, André Versaille, Bruxelles, 2011 . Également publié sous le titre Le Procès Eichmann, Complexe, « La Mémoire du Siècle », Bruxelles, 1989
 L'Heure d'exactitude ; Histoire, mémoire, témoignage, (Entretiens avec Séverine Nikel), Albin Michel, 2011 
 Nouvelles perspectives sur la Shoah, PUF, Paris, 2013, 128 p. .
 1945, La découverte, Seuil, Paris, janvier 2015, 282 p. .
 avec  (dir.), Le moment Eichmann, Albin Michel, 2016 
 avec , Tristes grossesses : l'affaire des époux Bac (1953-1956), Paris, Le Seuil, 2019.

References

Historians of the Holocaust
1948 births
20th-century French historians
Jewish historians
French people of Polish-Jewish descent
Living people
Writers from Paris
Commandeurs of the Légion d'honneur
Commanders of the Ordre national du Mérite
French Maoists
21st-century French historians
Prix Femina essai winners